The Confédération Générale du Travail-Syndicaliste Révolutionnaire (General Confederation of Revolutionary Trade Unions) was a trade union federation in France founded in 1926 by Pierre Besnard with the help of the Spanish CNT. It was affiliated to the International Workers' Association.

It was an anarchist split from the Confédération générale du travail unitaire (CGT-U) and was made illegal in 1939.

Theoretical Legacy 

Its legacy comprises the charter of Lyons, which founded anti-political syndicalism.

Syndicalist Activity 
It took part in the major struggles of its time, like anti-colonialism, the strikes of June 1936 in France, or the support to Spanish Republicans during the Spanish Civil War and the resistance to the Nazis.

The CGT-SR actively opposed French colonialism, both in Algeria and in France. For the occasion of the centenary of the colonisation of Algeria, in 1930, a declaration denouncing colonialism was signed by the Union Anarchiste, the CGT-SR and the Association des Fédéralistes Anarchistes.

Famous members 

Pierre Besnard
Victor Giraud
Paul Lapeyre
Sail Mohamed (1894–1953)
Adrien Perrissaguet
Vincent Joseph (1920- )
Antoine Turmo

References

See also 

Anarchism in France

Trade unions in France
Defunct anarchist organizations in France
Anarcho-syndicalists
French syndicalists
National trade union centers of France
Trade unions established in 1926
Trade unions disestablished in 1939
Revolutionary Syndicalism
Syndicalist trade unions